Aleksei Vyacheslavovich Panin (born 10 September 1977) is a Russian actor. Laureate of the State Prize of the Russian Federation (2003). He attended Russian Academy of Theatre Arts. In February 2013, Panin came out as bisexual.

Selected filmography
 Demobbed (2000)
 The Romanovs: An Imperial Family (2000)
 In August of 1944 (2001)
 Down House (2001)
 The Star (2002)
 Dead Man's Bluff (2005)
 Rzhevsky versus Napoleon (2008)
 The Best Movie 2 (2009)
 O Lucky Man! (2009)
 Spy (2012)

References

External links

1977 births
Living people
Male actors from Moscow
Russian male film actors
Russian male television actors
State Prize of the Russian Federation laureates
Russian LGBT actors
Bisexual male actors
Russian LGBT rights activists
21st-century LGBT people
Russian activists against the 2022 Russian invasion of Ukraine